"Sometimes" is a 1975 song written by Bill Anderson, and performed by Bill Anderson and Mary Lou Turner.

Background
That song turned out to be “Sometimes.” The song was written by Bill Anderson while riding on a bus during his tour of England. He picked up a magazine and was reading a review of the new movie, Shampoo. The columnist had written about a part in the film where one of the actors asks another if the person is married and the response was “sometimes.” Great songwriters always look for a line like that to trigger an idea. Anderson instantly took the ball and ran with it. His immediate thought was that the comment could be transformed into a duet between a man and a woman. Since there was no paper to write on in the bus, he tore a page out of the magazine he was reading and jotted down the lyrics on it. He finished the song before he got to his destination.

Charts
"Sometimes"  went to number one on the country chart, where it stayed for a single week and spent a total of eleven weeks on the chart.

Weekly charts

Year-end charts

Cover versions
 In 1977, R&B trio, Facts of Life reached number thirty-one on the U.S. Billboard Hot 100 with their version which was produced by Millie Jackson.

References
 

1975 singles
1975 songs
Bill Anderson (singer) songs
Mary Lou Turner songs
Songs written by Bill Anderson (singer)
Song recordings produced by Owen Bradley
Male–female vocal duets
MCA Records singles